Eskew+Dumez+Ripple is an American architecture practice based in New Orleans, Louisiana founded by Allen Eskew in 1989. Steve Dumez and Mark Ripple became partners in 2000 along with three others. The firm rebranded as Eskew+Dumez+Ripple in 2003.

They were the recipients of the AIA 2014 Architecture Firm Award.

Notable projects
New Orleans Riverfront Development Plan, 2012
Louisiana State History Museum
930 Poydras Residential Tower, New Orleans
Prospect.1 Welcome Center, New Orleans
Hilliard Art Museum,  Lafayette

References

External links 
Official website

Architecture firms based in Louisiana
Modernist architects
Companies based in New Orleans
Design companies established in 1989
1989 establishments in Louisiana